Luis Cáceres is the name of:

Luis Cáceres (footballer), Paraguayan footballer
Luis Cáceres (politician), Peruvian politician

See also
Luisa Cáceres de Arismendi